Jovan Crnić (born November 29, 1994) is a Serbian professional basketball player who plays for Sloboda Tuzla of the Basketball Championship of Bosnia and Herzegovina.

High school & College 
From 2011 to 2013, he attended a boarding school, Hawaii Preparatory Academy in Waimea. From 2013 to 2015, he played for Northern Oklahoma College, and in 2015 he transferred to Abilane Christian University, where he graduated in 2017.

Professional career 
He started his professional career in 2017, and played for Tbilisi, Žilina, Sloboda and Andrezieux ALS Basket. In 2020, he joined Kumanovo of the Macedonian First League.

In 2021, he signed for Sloboda Tuzla of the Basketball Championship of Bosnia and Herzegovina.

References

External links 

 Jovan Crnić Highlight - 6'6 combo guard from Serbia
 Jovan Crnic - 6'6 Point Guard from Serbia

1994 births
Living people
Abilene Christian Wildcats men's basketball players
BC Dinamo Tbilisi players
KK Sloboda Užice players
Northern Oklahoma Mavericks men's basketball players
Serbian expatriate basketball people in the United States
Serbian men's basketball players
Shooting guards
Small forwards
Basketball players from Niš
OKK Sloboda Tuzla players
Serbian expatriate basketball people in Georgia (country)
Serbian expatriate basketball people in Slovakia
Serbian expatriate basketball people in France
Serbian expatriate basketball people in North Macedonia
Serbian expatriate basketball people in Bosnia and Herzegovina